Scott Case may refer to:

 Scott Case (American football) (born 1962), former American football player
 Scott Case (business), technologist, entrepreneur and inventor